Sauceda is a surname. Notable people with the surname include:

Gregorio Sauceda-Gamboa (born c. 1965), Mexican drug trafficker
Héctor Manuel Sauceda Gamboa (died 2009), Mexican drug trafficker
Sunny Sauceda, American musician
Sergio Sauceda (born 1973), Mexican track and field athlete